North Carolina game lands are areas of public and private land comprising some  in North Carolina managed by the North Carolina Wildlife Resources Commission for public hunting, trapping, and inland fishing.

References

External links 

 Information from the North Carolina Wildlife Resources Commission

Protected areas of North Carolina